Admiral Lopez may refer to:

Anita L. Lopez (fl. 1980s–2010s), NOAA Commissioned Officer Corps rear admiral 
Robert F. Lopez (1857–1936), U.S. Navy rear admiral
Thomas J. Lopez (born 1940), U.S. Navy admiral